Ibish may refer to:

Hussein Ibish, American author and Arab advocate
Yerizak, Armenia